Powder River County District High School (PRCDHS) is the only high school in Powder River County, Montana, in the United States and is located in Broadus, the only incorporated town in that county.

Academics
As of November 1, 2014, the Powder River County District High School had 135 enrolled students, coming from four counties (Powder River, Rosebud, Carter, and Custer) in Southeastern Montana, and some from Crook County in Wyoming. The school supports eight school buses bringing students from the census-designated places Ashland and Biddle and the unincorporated communities Boyes, Hammond, Coalwood, Powderville, and Volborg. Activities include Business Professionals of America (BPA), Future Farmers of America (FFA), Students Against Destructive Decisions (SADD), speech and drama, and music.

Athletics
The school's mascot is the hawk, and its colors are green, white, and gold. Athletics include football, girls' volleyball, boys' basketball, girls' basketball, wrestling, track and field, girls' golf, boys' golf, girls cross-country, and cheerleading.

References

External links
 Broadus Public Schools district website

Public high schools in Montana
1924 establishments in Montana
Educational institutions established in 1924